Chi Gamma Epsilon is a local fraternity at the American Ivy League university of Dartmouth College.  "Chi Gam," as it is commonly known, was part of the Kappa Sigma fraternity before breaking off for political reasons.  On campus, Chi Gam is known for its dance parties such as Gammapalooza, its house pong game known as ship  and its commitment to community service. In past years Chi Gam gained a reputation as the "Baseball Frat,"  although now the house is populated by a wide variety of different people, including members of the Dartmouth Lightweight Crew team, Dartmouth Cross Country team, and leaders of student organizations.

History

Chi Gamma Epsilon began as the fraternal organization Beta Gamma in 1904. There were 11 founding members. In 1905, Beta Gamma was given national status as the Gamma Epsilon chapter of Kappa Sigma at Dartmouth College. From 1914 to 1916, the brothers raised enough money to build a small wooden house in an empty lot at 7 Webster Avenue. The house was razed in 1935 for need of a larger structure. By 1937, the new house was completed. Ives Atherton ’24 is credited with heading construction and gathering funds.

The house became a local fraternity in 1981 due to a dispute with the national organization and changed its name from Kappa Sigma to Kappa Sigma Gamma. The house further separated itself from the national organization by undergoing a name change to the current Chi Gamma Epsilon. The brothers voted upon this on March 31, 1987. In between the deliberation period, the house was called 7 Webster Ave. The Gamma Epsilon part of the name originates from the fact that the house was originally the Gamma Epsilon chapter of Kappa Sigma.

Notable alumni

 Burke W. Whitman ‘78, Major General U. S. Marine Corps
 Michael Moriarty ‘63, award-winning star of stage and screen. Credits include “Holocaust”, “Bang the Drum Slowly” and “Law & Order” 1990-1994.
 Russell Carson '55 (General Partner of Welsh, Carson, Anderson & Stowe, member of Dartmouth Board of Trustees, for whom Carson Hall at Dartmouth is named)
John Donahoe '82 (CEO of Nike, Chairman of PayPal and former CEO of eBay)
 Jim Beattie '76 (MLB pitcher 1978-1986)
 Brad Ausmus '91 (MLB catcher, All Star, manager of the Detroit Tigers)
 Mike Remlinger '87 (MLB pitcher 1991-2005)
 Ed Lucas '04 (MLB utility infielder with the Miami Marlins, currently with the Arizona Diamondbacks)

References

Student societies in the United States
Dartmouth College Greek organizations
Student organizations established in 1904
1904 establishments in New Hampshire